Petrusewicz is a Polish gender-neutral surname of Eash-Slavic origin. Archaic feminine forms: Petrusewiczowna (maiden name), Petrusewiczowa (surname by husband). It should be distinguished from the spelling Pietrusiewicz which conforms to the Polish phonology, which is usually a by-name in the noble Polish clan Wysoczański. It is a patronymic surname derived from the East Slavic given name Petrus', a diminutive of Piotr/Petro/Piatro (Peter).

Russian-language transliteration: Petrusevich, Belarusian: Petrusevich, Ukrainian: Petrusevych, Lithuanianized form: Petrusevičius. Latvian:  Petrusēviča (feminine), Petrusēvičs (masculine)

Notable people with this surname include:

Irena Hausmanowa-Petrusewicz (1917–2015), Polish doctor, neurologist
Marek Petrusewicz (1934–1992), Polish swimmer
Kazimierz Petrusewicz, Polish Communist revolutionary, professor
, Polish and Russian revolutionary and lawyer 

 (1912– ?), Soviet engineer, recipient of Lenin and Stalin prizes
Nikolai Petrusevich (1838–1880), Russian general, geologist, geographer, and scientist
Ināra Petrusēviča (born 1969), Latvian artist

Polish-language surnames
Patronymic surnames